Hamilton Branch is a stream in Polk County, Florida, in the United States.

Hamilton Branch bears the name of George Hamilton, an early settler.

See also
List of rivers of Florida

References

Rivers of Polk County, Florida
Rivers of Florida